Athletics has featured as a sport at the European Youth Summer Olympic Festival since its first edition in 1991. It has appeared on the programme at every subsequent edition of the biennial multi-sport event for European athletes under the age of 18. This age group corresponds with the youth category of athletics competition. However, during the games 2013, 2015 and 2017, the age group was changed to only include athletes under the age of 17. From the Baku games in 2019, the under-18 is again the age standard. That is, athletes must be either at the age of 16 or 17 of the year of the festival.

Editions

Festival records

Boys

Girls

See also
International athletics championships and games
Figure skating at the European Youth Olympic Festival

References

EUROPEAN YOUTH OLYMPICS EYOF . World Junior Athletics History. Retrieved on 2014-11-23.
European Youth Olympic Festival. GBR Athletics. Retrieved on 2014-11-23.

 
European Youth Summer Olympic Festival
European Youth Summer Olympic Festival
European Youth Olympics
Sports at the European Youth Summer Olympic Festival